Lee Mison is a South Korean judge. She was appointed to Justice of the Constitutional Court of Korea in 2019.

Career 
1994  36th National Bar Examination
1997  Judicial Research & Training Institute
1997  Judge, Seoul District Court 
2001  Judge, Cheongju District Court 
2005  Judge, Suwon District Court
2006  Judge, Daejeon High Court
2009  Judge, Daejeon District Court
2010  Research Judge, Supreme Court
2015  Presiding Judge, Suwon District Court
2017  Presiding Judge, Seoul Central District Court 
2019  Justice of the Constitutional Court of Korea

References

External links 
 Profile at the Constitutional Court of Korea Homepage

1970 births
Living people
South Korean judges
South Korean women judges
Pusan National University alumni